The following lists events that happened during 1857 in South Africa.

Incumbents
 Governor of the Cape of Good Hope and High Commissioner for Southern Africa: Sir George Grey.
 Lieutenant-governor of the Colony of Natal: John Scott.
 State President of the Orange Free State: Jacobus Nicolaas Boshoff.
 President of the Executive Council of the South African Republic: Marthinus Wessel Pretorius (from 6 January).

Events
January
 6 – Marthinus Wessel Pretorius becomes the first President of the Executive Council of the South African Republic (Zuid Afrikaansche Republiek).

June
 29 – Act no. 10 of 29 June 1857 grants the Cape Town Railway and Dock Company approval to construct a  railway between Cape Town and Wellington.

Unknown date
 Robert Moffat completes Old Testament Bible translation into Setswana. 
 About 157 Irish women arrive on the ship  and settle in British Kaffraria.
 The first Legislative Council is selected in the Natal Colony. 
 The Union Steam Ship Company wins the first mail contract for regular mail service between Great Britain and South Africa.
 The Cape Point Lighthouse at Cape Point is built.
 Building of the Roman Rock Lighthouse at the entrance to Simon's Town starts and only completed in 1861.

Births
 2 October – Martinus Theunis Steyn, lawyer, politician and statesman, last president of the independent Orange Free State. (d. 1916)

Deaths
 15 December – Anna Maria Truter, Cape Colony botanical artist and wife of Sir John Barrow, 1st Baronet. (b. 1777)

References

South Africa
Years in South Africa
History of South Africa